Sean Canfield (born November 12, 1986) is a former American football quarterback. He was selected by the New Orleans Saints in the seventh round of the 2010 NFL Draft. Canfield played college football at Oregon State.

Early years
Canfield attended Carlsbad High School in Carlsbad, California. As a senior, he completed 119 of 214 passes for 1,691 yards and 13 touchdowns.

College career
After being redshirted as a freshman in 2005, Canfield played in eight games as a backup quarterback in 2006, completing 28 of 45 passes for 355 yards two touchdowns and three interceptions. As a sophomore in 2007 Canfield started the first nine games for the Beavers before suffering an injury against the USC Trojans. He finished the season completing 165 of 286 passes for 1,661 yards, nine touchdowns and 15 interceptions. As a junior in 2008 he missed most of the teams practice in August and the first few weeks of the season while rehabilitating from his left shoulder  injury that he suffered the previous season. He ended up starting only two games. He finished the season completing 56 of 84 attempts for 703 yards with six touchdowns and two interceptions.

Canfield finished his senior season in 2009 with completing 303 of 446 pass attempts for 3,271 yards, 21 touchdowns, and seven interceptions as the Beavers ended the season with an 8–5 record.

Statistics

Source:

Professional career

He was rated the 16th best quarterback in the 2010 NFL Draft by NFLDraftScout.com. He was selected by the New Orleans Saints with the 239th overall pick. Prior to being waived on August 31, he was competing for the backup quarterback position behind starter Drew Brees. During the 2010 season, Canfield spent time jumping back and forth from the active roster to the practice squad without seeing any game action. He was re-signed to the active roster from the practice squad following the season, but was waived during final roster cuts again on September 3, 2011. He spent time on the team's practice squad and active roster again during the season. He was re-signed to the active roster following the season on January 14, 2012. On August 31, 2012, the Saints cut Canfield.

References

External links

New Orleans Saints bio
Oregon State Beavers bio

American football quarterbacks
Oregon State Beavers football players
New Orleans Saints players
1986 births
Living people
Players of American football from California
Sportspeople from Carlsbad, California